Velluire is a former commune in the Vendée department in the Pays de la Loire region in western France. On 1 January 2019, it was merged into the new commune Les Velluire-sur-Vendée. The town lies on the river Vendée to the south west of Fontenay-le-Comte.

See also
Communes of the Vendée department

References

Former communes of Vendée